J. Tune Entertainment (formerly known as Rainy Entertainment) was a Korean music record label founded in November 2007 by Rain. It was a subsidiary of JYP Entertainment.  The label was fully merged into JYP Entertainment in November 2013.

History
In November 2007, Rain told the Korean media that he has left JYP Entertainment and started his own entertainment company, J. Tune Entertainment (formerly known as Rainy Entertainment). He was scheduled to be CEO of the company, but told the media that he still kept in touch with his mentor and long-time trainer Park Jin-young.

In May 2008, Yeon Jung-hoon signed with J.Tune Entertainment after his military discharge.

In 2009, J. Tune Entertainment had a female trainee who was claimed by the Korean media to be the female version of Rain. The unknown female was dismissed by the company for unspecified reasons.

In July 2010, Rain reportedly sold his shares of J. Tune Entertainment to his mentor Park Jin-Young.

In December 2010, Park Jin-Young announced that J. Tune Entertainment would be merged with JYP Entertainment. JYP Entertainment become the largest shareholder in J. Tune Entertainment and it is viewed as a strategic alliance between the two companies.

In 2011, Rain announced that he will be enlisted in the army.

In June 2011, Yung Jung Hoon left J. Tune Entertainment to sign a contract with DBM Entertainment, joining the same company as long-time friend and fellow actress Lee Da-hae.

In May 2013, it was announced that Rain will be joining Cube Entertainment after he is discharged from his military service in July 2013.

J. Tune Entertainment and JYP Entertainment's fusion
On December 27, 2010, JYP Entertainment announced, ‘JYP Entertainment and its employees have become the biggest shareholder of J.Tune Entertainment via third party shares allotment.‘

JYPE continued, ‘Some time ago, J.Tune’s talent Rain approached JYPE producer Park Jin Young with a proposal. Until he joins the army next year, Rain will focus solely on his singing and acting activities. Also, he proposed that JYPE be in charge of his company’s management.‘

Both sides revealed, ‘JYPE’s shareholders had the same suggestion as Rain’s, and the proposal accepted after a review.’

JYPE expressed, ‘In the future, Rain will be able to freely and actively promote himself with the best support behind him. In the last three years, Rain has gained a lot of experience, which would create a strong and positive synergy between both.’

Subsidiaries

J. Tune Camp

J. Tune Camp, a former J. Tune Entertainment subsidiary, was an independent music record label based in South Korea. Founded in 2009 by J. Tune Entertainment, the record label roster of artists included MBLAQ. Founded in 2009 by J. Tune Entertainment, J. Tune Camp debuted their first artists, MBLAQ, in October 2009. Following the merger of J. Tune Entertainment with JYP Entertainment on December 27, 2010, J. Tune Camp stated in an interview with Newsen on January 3, 2011, that "J. Tune Camp and J. Tune Entertainment are separate corporate bodies" and that the merger of J. Tune Entertainment and JYP Entertainment will not affect the label. It also stated that MBLAQ will not be seen as part of JYP Entertainment. On February, 2017, G.O wrote a letter to fans, hinting the closing of J.Tune Camp.
Allkpop has confirmed the dissipation of the label, said  "J.Tune Camp has basically dissipated. All the managers left, and Mad Town has signed with another label. They don't even have a celebrity that can promote, so it won't be able to be a company."

Former artists
 MBLAQ (2009–2016) (Hiatus)
 Lee Joon (2009–2014)
 Thunder (2009–2014)
 Two X (2012–2014)
 Madtown (2014–2016)
 Pro C (Inactive)

Former Artists
 Yeon Jung-hoon
 Rain
 Two X
 Madtown

Embezzlement Lawsuit
In April 2010, a fabric manufacturing company filed a lawsuit against Rain and his agency J.Tune Entertainment, saying that they had suffered financial losses due to J.Tune's fashion affiliate J.Tune Creative. The plaintiff claimed that the company had an investment of two billion won, but Rain and other shareholders of J.Tune Creative embezzled their money by falsely registering the company's stock assets worth 2.5 billion won and claiming the 2.2 billion won total fee for Rain's modeling work were unreasonable.

In December 2010, prosecutors ruled that they found the fabric company's accusation on J.Tune Creative falsely registering the company's stock assets as fake, and that Rain's modeling fees of 2.2 billion during three years was not excessive. However, prosecutors indicted two officials at J.Tune for embezzling 900 million won of the firm's money used to acquire a larger stake in the agency.

References

External links 
 J. Tune Entertainment - Official Website

 
JYP Entertainment
K-pop record labels
South Korean record labels
Companies disestablished in 2013
Defunct record labels of South Korea
Rain (entertainer)